Moa Elin Marianne Hjelmer (born 19 June 1990) is a Swedish athlete who competes in the 200 metres and 400 metres. Hjelmer was born in Stockholm. She won a silver medal in the Junior European Championships in 2011 in Ostrava. She beat the Swedish record time on 400 metres on 14 August 2011, then beat it twice during the European Championship in Helsinki in 2012. On 29 June 2012 she won a gold medal at the 2012 European Athletics Championships in Helsinki when she won the 400 metres final on a new Swedish record time of 51.13 seconds. She had set the previous record time at the previous day's semi final race.

On 13 December 2013, Hjelmer revealed that she was pregnant and would not compete during 2014.

Competition record

References

1990 births
Living people
Swedish female sprinters
Athletes (track and field) at the 2012 Summer Olympics
Olympic athletes of Sweden
Athletes from Stockholm
European Athletics Championships medalists
Swedish Athletics Championships winners
World Athletics Championships athletes for Sweden
Olympic female sprinters
21st-century Swedish women